Ravindra Kumar Pandey (born 20 January 1959) is an Indian politician belonging to Bharatiya Janata Party. He was a member of the Indian Parliament, representing Giridih (Lok Sabha constituency). He was denied ticket in the 2019 Lok Sabha election as the seat was given to AJSU's Chandraprakash Choudhary, who won the election thus being first Lok Sabha member from AJSU.

Biography 

His father was late Krishna Murari Pandey, and his mother is Ramdulari Devi. He was born in a place called Ghutiatand, in Bokaro district, Jharkhand state, (Brahmin family) India. He holds a bachelor's degree, and was educated at K. B. College, Bermo. He is married to Laxmi Pandey, and has three sons and two daughters. He has been M.P. from Giridih for 5 terms. He defeated Jagannath Mahto in 2014 Lok Sabha elections. He is from Tamsi of Aurangabad district of Bihar. He is mentally well.

References 

1959 births
Living people
Bharatiya Janata Party politicians from Jharkhand
People from Giridih district
India MPs 2009–2014
India MPs 1996–1997
India MPs 1998–1999
India MPs 1999–2004
Lok Sabha members from Jharkhand
India MPs 2014–2019
People from Bokaro district